Progressive Rail Inc.  is a shortline railroad and owner of several other shortlines. PGR is directly operating several separate branches in Minnesota including the Airlake Terminal Railway. Progressive Rail also acquired the Wisconsin Northern Division in Chippewa Falls, Wisconsin and operates as a separately-named division. They also own the Chicago Junction Railroad, Clackamas Valley Railway, the Iowa Traction Railway and Iowa Southern Railway in Iowa, the Piedmont & Northern Railroad, the Crab Orchard and Egyptian Railroad in Illinois, the St. Paul & Pacific Northwest Railroad, and the Wisconsin Northern Railroad. 

Progressive Rail is also known as the Cannon Valley Railroad .

The PGR branches are listed as follows:
 Transload Industrial Park (Airlake Terminal Railway) - Lakeville, Minnesota
 The "High Line" (a.k.a. Dan Patch Line) - Bloomington, Minnesota, Richfield, Minnesota, and Minneapolis, Minnesota. Service begins at Auto Club Yard in Bloomington and serves a variety of industries
 The "Jesse James Line" - Northfield to Lakeville, leased CP Rail trackage
 Northfield to Faribault, Minnesota via leased Union Pacific trackage
 Northfield to Cannon Falls, Minnesota, with service to the Great Western Industrial Park in Randolph, Minnesota.
 Eagandale Industrial line (Eagan, Minnesota) via leased CP Rail trackage (former Milwaukee Road)
 Santa Cruz Branch Line - Davenport to Watsonville, California (operating with the Santa Cruz, Big Trees, and Pacific Railway as a subcontractor)

History
Headquartered in Lakeville, Minnesota (a southern suburb of Minneapolis-St. Paul), Progressive Rail, Inc. was established in 1996 to initially serve the Airlake Industrial Park. In 2001, they leased the former Minneapolis, Northfield and Southern Railway "High Line" in Bloomington and Richfield and started restoring trackage. The company's philosophy has been to provide service that a large railway chooses not to provide. They have also focused on economic development, including finding new customers, and working on regaining former rail customers along their lines. This strategy has paid off in an increase in traffic, from 600 carloads in their first year of operation to more than 5000 carloads in 2003.

Major commodities include resins, chemicals, fuels, lumber, gypsum board, cement, fly-ash, metals, paper, machinery, food and kindred products, scrap material, and consumer products.

Progressive Rail, Inc. also operates wholly owned subsidiary Progressive Rail Specialized Logistics, which provides rail logistics services for machinery and over-dimensional freight shippers.

Locomotive roster

References

External links

 Progressive Rail, Inc. official site
 Progressive Rail Specialized Logistics official site
 Current locomotive roster
 Union Pacific shortline customer description
 Canadian Pacific shortline customer description
 University of Minnesota Railroad Club

Minnesota railroads
Railway companies established in 1996
Switching and terminal railroads